Md. Abul Hasnat Chowdhury is a Bangladesh Nationalist Party politician and the former Member of Parliament of Bogra-2.

Career
Chowdhury was elected to parliament from Bogra-2 as a Bangladesh Nationalist Party candidate in 1979.

References

Bangladesh Nationalist Party politicians
Living people
2nd Jatiya Sangsad members
Year of birth missing (living people)